Protoporphyrinogen oxidase or protox is an enzyme that in humans is encoded by the PPOX gene.

Protoporphyrinogen oxidase is responsible for the seventh step in biosynthesis of protoporphyrin IX. This porphyrin is the precursor to hemoglobin, the oxygen carrier in animals, and chlorophyll, the dye in plants. The enzyme catalyzes the dehydrogenation (removal of hydrogen atoms) of protoporphyrinogen IX (the product of the sixth step in the production of heme) to form protoporphyrin IX. One additional enzyme must modify protoporphyrin IX before it becomes heme.  Inhibition of this enzyme is a strategy used in certain herbicides.

Gene 

The PPOX gene is located on the long (q) arm of chromosome 1 at position 22, from base pair 157,949,266 to base pair 157,954,082.

Function 

This gene encodes the penultimate enzyme of heme biosynthesis, which catalyzes the 6-electron oxidation of protoporphyrinogen IX to form protoporphyrin IX. This protein is a flavoprotein associated with the outer surface of the inner mitochondrial membrane.

Heme biosynthetic pathway 

The following genes encode enzymes that catalyze the various steps in the heme biosynthetic pathway:

 ALAD: aminolevulinate, delta-, dehydratase
 ALAS1: aminolevulinate, delta-, synthase 1
 ALAS2: aminolevulinate, delta-, synthase 2 (sideroblastic/hypochromic anemia)
 CPOX: coproporphyrinogen oxidase
 FECH: ferrochelatase (protoporphyria)
 HMBS: hydroxymethylbilane synthase
 PPOX: protoporphyrinogen oxidase
 UROD: uroporphyrinogen decarboxylase
 UROS: uroporphyrinogen III synthase (congenital erythropoietic porphyria)

Clinical significance 

Variegate porphyria is caused by mutations in the PPOX gene. More than 100 mutations that can cause variegate porphyria have been identified in the PPOX gene. One mutation, a substitution of the amino acid tryptophan for arginine at position 59 (also written as Arg59Trp or R59W), is found in about 95 percent of South African families with variegate porphyria. Mutations in the PPOX gene reduce the activity of the enzyme made by the gene, allowing byproducts of heme production to build up in the body. This buildup, in combination with nongenetic factors (such as certain drugs, alcohol and dieting), causes this type of porphyria.

Inhibitors as herbicides
Inhibition of protoporphyrinogen oxidase is a mechanism of action for several commercial herbicides including the nitrophenyl ethers acifluorfen and fomesafen and the pyrimidinediones butafenacil and saflufenacil. The visible symptoms of treatment are chlorosis and desiccation. The damage is caused by an accumulation of protoporphyrin IX in the plant cells by inhibiting protox within the tetrapyrrole biosynthesis pathway. This is a potent photosensitizer which activates oxygen, leading to lipid peroxidation. Both light and oxygen are required for this process to kill the plant.

See also 
 Porphyrin

References

Further reading

External links 
 PDBe-KB provides an overview of all the structure information available in the PDB for Human Protoporphyrinogen oxidase

EC 1.3.3